Holdener is a surname. Notable people with the surname include:

Judy A. Holdener (born 1965), American mathematician and educator
Wendy Holdener (born 1993), Swiss alpine skier

See also
Holender